This is a list of natural history museums, also known as museums of natural history, i.e. museums whose exhibits focus on the subject of natural history, including such topics as animals, plants, ecosystems, geology, paleontology, and climatology.

Some museums feature natural-history collections in addition to other collections, such as ones related to history, art and science. In addition, nature centers often include natural-history exhibits.

Africa

Algeria
Beni Abbes Museum (Musee de Beni-Abbes), Béni Abbès

Angola
National Museum of Natural History of Angola (Museu Nacional de História Natural de Angola), Luanda

Botswana
Botswana National Museum, Gaborone

Egypt
Egyptian Geological Museum, Cairo
Alexandria Aquarium Museum, Alexandria

Ethiopia
Zoological Natural History Museum, Addis Ababa

Kenya
 Kitale Museum, Kitale
 National Museums of Kenya, Nairobi

Mozambique
Museu de História Natural de Moçambique, Maputo

Namibia
National Earth Science Museum, Geological Survey of Namibia, Windhoek

Nigeria
Natural History Museum, OAU, Ifẹ, located at the Obafemi Awolowo University

South Africa
Albany Museum, Grahamstown
 Amathole Museum, King William's Town
Bleloch Geological Museum, University of the Witwatersrand, Johannesburg
Wits Life Sciences Museum, University of the Witwatersrand, Johannesburg
 CP Nel Museum, Oudtshoorn
Natural Science Museum, Durban
 Iziko South African Museum, Cape Town
McGregor Museum, Kimberley
KwaZulu-Natal Museum, Pietermaritzburg
National Museum, Bloemfontein
Port Elizabeth Museum, Port Elizabeth
Ditsong National Museum of Natural History, Pretoria
West Coast Fossil Park, Langebaanweg

Sudan
Sudan Natural History Museum, Khartoum

Tanzania
Olduvai Gorge Museum, Ngorongoro Conservation Area

Tunisia
 Musée Océanographique de Salammbô, Carthage

Uganda
Zoology Museum, Makarere University, Kampala
Makerere University Herbarium, Makarere University, Kampala
Uganda Museum, Kampala
Herbarium, Institute of Tropical Forest Conservation, Kabale

Zimbabwe
Natural History Museum of Zimbabwe, Bulawayo

Asia

Armenia
 Geological Museum, Yerevan
 Natural History Museum, Yerevan

Azerbaijan
Natural History Museum named after Hasanbey Zardabi, Baku
Azerbaijan Geology Museum, Baku
"Rinay" Malacofauna Museum, Baku

China
Shanghai Natural History Museum, Shanghai
Chongqing Natural History Museum, Chongqing
Tianjin Natural History Museum, Tianjin
Beijing Museum of Natural History, Beijing
Geological Museum of China, Beijing
Dalian Natural History Museum, Dalian
Zhejiang Museum of Natural History, Hangzhou
Neimenggu Museum of Natural History, Huhhot
Wuhan Museum of Natural History, Wuhan
Guangxi Museum of Natural History, Nanning
Shanxi Museum of Natural History, Xian
Jilin Museum of Natural History, Changchun
Tianyu Museum of Natural History, Pingyi
Zigong Dinosaur Museum, Zigong

Hong Kong
Stephen Hui Geological Museum, the University of Hong Kong, Hong Kong

India
Bengal Natural History Museum, Darjeeling
Chhatrapati Shivaji Maharaj Vastu Sangrahalaya, Museum of Western India, Mumbai
Gass Forest Museum, Coimbatore
Government Museum, Egmore, Chennai
Indian Museum, Kolkata
Napier Museum, Kerala
National Museum of Natural History, New Delhi (1972–2016)
Thar Natural History Fossil Museum Churu, Rajasthan
Bombay Natural History Society (BNHS)
Thiruvananthapuram Natural History Museum

Indonesia
Bandung Geological Museum, Bandung
Bogor Zoology Museum, Bogor

Iran
Museum of Natural History and Technology, Shiraz
Natural History Museum, University of Zanjan, Zanjan
Natural History Museum, Isfahan
Iran Museum of Natural History and Wildlife, Tehran
Natural History Museum, Ferdowsi University of Mashhad, Mashhad
Natural History Museum, Institute of Botany and Plant Pests, Tehran
Natural History Museum, Hakim Sabzevari University, Sabzevar

Iraq
Iraq Natural History Museum, Baghdad

Israel
Geological Museum, Jerusalem
Natural History Museum, Jerusalem
The Steinhardt Museum of Natural History, Tel Aviv
Bloomfield Science Museum, Jerusalem
Biblical Museum of Natural History, Beit Shemesh

Japan
Abiko City Museum of Birds, Abiko, Chiba Prefecture
Fukui City Museum of Natural History , Fukui, Fukui Prefecture
Fukui Prefectural Dinosaur Museum, Katsuyama, Fukui Prefecture
Geological Museum, Tsukuba, Ibaraki Prefecture
Gunma Museum of Natural History, Tomioka, Gunma Prefecture
Hiroshima City Ebayama Museum of Meteorology, Hiroshima, Hiroshima Prefecture
Ibaraki Nature Museum, Bandō, Ibaraki Prefecture
Kanagawa Prefectural Museum of Natural History , Odawara, Kanagawa Prefecture
Kannonzaki Nature Museum, Yokosuka, Kanagawa Prefecture
Kitakyushu Museum of Natural History and Human History, Kitakyūshū, Fukuoka Prefecture
Kyushu University Museum, Kyushu University, Fukuoka, Fukuoka Prefecture
Museum of Natural History, Tohoku University, Sendai, Miyagi Prefecture
Museum of Nature and Human Activities, Sanda, Hyōgo Prefecture
National Museum of Nature and Science, Taitō, Tokyo
Natural History Museum and Institute, Chiba, Chiba Prefecture
Natural History Museum and Zoological Park, Toyohashi, Aichi prefecture
Natural History Museum Kutchan, Kutchan, Hokkaidō
Nawa Insect Museum, Gifu, Gifu Prefecture
Okhotsk Sea Ice Museum of Hokkaidō, Monbetsu, Hokkaidō
Osaka Museum of Natural History, Osaka, Osaka Prefecture
Pearl Museum, Mikimoto Pearl Island, Toba, Mie Prefecture
Saitama Museum of Natural History , Nagatoro, Saitama Prefecture
Tsuyama Museum of Science Education, Tsuyama, Okayama Prefecture

Jordan
Pella Museum, Amman

South Korea
Ewha Womans University Natural History Museum, Seoul
Gyeoryongsan Natural History Museum
Seodaemun Museum of Natural History, Seoul

Kyrgyzstan
Geological Museum and Mineralogical Museum, Bishkek

Malaysia
Muzium Negara, Kuala Lumpur
Natural History Museum, Putrajaya

Mongolia
Central Museum of Mongolian Dinosaurs, Ulaanbaatar
Mongolian Natural History Museum, Ulaanbaatar

Oman
Natural History Museum of Muscat, Muscat

Pakistan
Pakistan Museum of Natural History

Philippines
National Museum of Natural History, Manila
UPLB Museum of Natural History, University of the Philippines Los Baños

Qatar
Qatar National Museum, Doha

Singapore
Science Centre Singapore
Lee Kong Chian Natural History Museum

Taiwan
 National Museum of Natural Science, Taichung
 National Museum of Taiwan History, Tainan City
 National Taiwan Museum, Taipei City
 National Chiayi University Insect Museum, Chiayi City

Thailand
 Thailand National Science Museum, Pathum Thani
 Chulalongkorn University Museum of Natural History, Bangkok
 Chulalongkorn University's Geological Museum, Bangkok
 Chulalongkorn University's Traditional Medicine Museum, Bangkok
 Mahidol University's Mollusk Museum, Bangkok
 Mahidol University's Mosquito Museum, Bangkok
 Mahidol University's Bio-Geo Path, Bangkok
 Rattanakosin Natural History Museum, Kasetsart University, Bangkok
 Veterinarical Anatomy Museum, Kasetsart University, Bangkok
 Pathology Museum, Kasetsart University, Bangkok
 Kasetsart University's Ant Museum, Bangkok
 Kasetsart University's Zoological Museum, Bangkok
 Kasetsart University Museum of Fisheries (Natural History), Bangkok
 Kasetsart University's 60th Anniversary Museum and Park of Insects, Bangkok
 Lichen Museum, Ramkhamhaeng University, Bangkok
 Bangkok Butterfly and Insect Park, Bangkok
 Dusit Zoo Museum, Bangkok
 Soil Museum, Bangkok
 Geological Museum, Bangkok
 Horn and Antler Museum, Bangkok
 Biological Science Museum at Faculaty of Science, Chiang Mai University, Chiang Mai
 Chiang Mai University's Geological Museum, Chiang Mai
 Museum of World Insects and Natural Heritages, Chiang Mai
 Lignite Learning Centre Museum, Lampang
 King Mongkut Memeorail Park of Science and Technology, Prachuap Khiri Khan
 Natural History Park, Ratchaburi
 Phu Wiang Dinosaur Museum, Khon Kaen
 Sirindhorn Museum, Kalasin
 Thai Island and Sea Natural History Museum, Chonburi
 Chonlatassanasathan Museum, Chonburi
 Phuket Seashell Museum, Phuket
 Bangkok Seashell Museum, Bangkok
Princess Maha Chakri Sirindhorn Natural History Museum, Prince of Songkla University, Hat Yai
 Prince of Songkla University's Traditional Medicine Museum, Hat Yai
 Natural History Museum and Local Learning Networks, Prince of Songkla University, Pattani

Turkey
Forestry Museum, also known as Watch Mansion, Bursa
MTA Natural History Museum, Ankara

United Arab Emirates
Sharjah Natural History Museum, Sharjah

Uzbekistan
Tabiat muzeyi, Tashkent

Vietnam
 Vietnam National Museum of Nature, Vietnam Academy of Science and Technology, Hanoi

Central America

Belize
 Chaa Creek Natural History Museum, San Ignacio

Costa Rica
 El Museo de Ciencias Naturales La Salle(The La Salle Natural Sciences Museum)
 El Museo de Insectos de la Universidad de Costa Rica (MIUCR) (The Museum of Insects at the University of Costa Rica)
 Museo de Zoologia – Escuela de Biologia, University of Costa Rica
 Museo Nacional de Costa Rica(National Museum of Costa Rica), San José

Dominican Republic
 Museo Nacional de Historia Natural Santo Domingo
 Amber Museum, Puerto Plata
 Amber World Museum, Santo Domingo

Grenada
 Museo de Ciencias

Guatemala
Museo Nacional de Historia Natural "Jorge A. Ibarra"
Museo de Historia Natural de la Universidad de San Carlos de Guatemala
Museo de Paleontologia y Arqueologia Ing. Roberto Woolfolk Saravia, Estanzuela Zacapa

Honduras
 Butterfly and Insect Museum, La Ceiba

Nicaragua
 Museo Ciencias Naturales de la Universidad Centroamericana, Managua
Museo de Ometepe, Rivas
Museo del Departamento de Malacología UCA, Managua
 Museo entomológico, León
Museo Gemológico de la Concha y el Caracol, Managua
Museo Paleontológico "El Hato", Managua
 Museos de Geología UNAN, Managua
 Museum Ecológico de Trópico Seco, Diriamba
 National Museum, Managua
Sitio Paleontológico El Bosque, Estelí

Panama
 Centro de Exhibiciones Marinas de Punta Culebra, Panama City
 Museo de Ciencias Naturales Panama, Panama City
 Museum of Biodiversity, Panama City
 Colección Zoológica Dr. Eustorgio Méndez, Panama City
 Museo de Vertebrados de la Universidad de Panamá, Panama City
 Museo de Invertebrados de la Universidad de Panamá, Panama City
 Museo de Malacología de la Universidad de Panamá, Panama City
 Círculo Herpetológico de Panamá, Panama City
 Herbario de la Universidad de Panamá, Panama City

Europe

Albania
 Natural Science Museum, Tirana

Austria
Bergbaumuseum Klagenfurt – Mining museum, mineralogy, palaeontology, Klagenfurt
Burgenlandische Landesmuseum, Eisenstadt
Haus der Natur, Salzburg
inatura – Erlebnis Naturschau Dornbirn Province Vorarlberg (in German), Dornbirn
Krahuletz-Museum Eggenburg Earth sciences and history (in German), Eggenburg
Landesmuseum für Kärnten, Klagenfurt Regional museum for the province Carinthia (in German), Klagenfurt
Landesmuseum Niederösterreichisches, St. Pölten Nature, history, culture and art of Lower Austria (in German)
Landschaftsmuseum im Schloss Trautenfels Natural and cultural history in upper Styria (German), Pürgg-Trautenfels
Museum der Stadt Mödling Nature and history, Mödling
Museum Schloss Lackenbach Man and nature, Lackenbach
Nationalparkzentrum Bios Mallnitz, Mallnitz
Oberösterreiches Landesmuseum – Biologiezentrum The natural history museum of Upper Austria, Linz
Sternwarte Kremsmünster, Kremsmünster
Styrassic Park An open air dinosaur park, Bad Gleichenberg
Tyrolean State Museum, Innsbruck
Universalmuseum Joanneum universal museum for natural and cultural history, Graz
Vienna Museum of Natural History, Vienna
Wienerwaldmuseum, Eichgraben

Belarus
Museum of Boulders
Museum of Nature, Belovezhskaya Pushcha Nature Reserve

Belgium
 Royal Belgian Institute of Natural Sciences, Brussels
Royal Museum for Central Africa, Tervuren

Bosnia and Herzegovina
 National Museum of Bosnia and Herzegovina, Sarajevo

Bulgaria
Burgas Museum, Natural History Exposition, Burgas
Earth and Man National Museum, Sofia
Historical Museum – Karnobat, Karnobat
History Museum – Panagyurishte, Panagyurishte
Kardjali Museum, Kardjali
Museum Collection of Natural Science "To Nature with Love", Byala Cherkva
Museum of Speleology and Bulgarian Karst, Chepelare
National Museum of Natural History, Bulgaria, Sofia
Natural History Museum of Varna, Varna
Natural History Museum of Ruse Ruse
Natural History Museum of Cherni Osam Lovech
Paleontological Museum, Asenovgrad
Regional Historical Museum in Pleven, Pleven
University of Mining & Geology Museum of Mineralogy, Petrography and Minerals, St. Ivan Rilski, Sofia

Canary Islands
(belongs politically to Spain)
Museum of Nature and Archeology (Museo de la Naturaleza y Arqueología), Tenerife

Croatia
Croatian Natural History Museum, Zagreb (Hrvatski prirodoslovni muzej)
Dubrovnik Natural History Museum, Dubrovnik
Hunting Museum, Zagreb
Karlovac Municipal Museum, Karlovac
Museum of Evolution and Prehistoric Human Habitation, Krapina
Museum of Slavonia, Osijek
Mushroom Museum, Zagreb
Natural History Museum, Rijeka
Natural History Museum and Zoo, Split
Ornithological Collection, Metković
Senj City Museum, Senj
Varazdin Municipal Museum: The Herzer Palace, Varaždin
Zoological Museum of Baranja – Kopačevo, Baranja – Kopačevo

Czech Republic
Moravian Museum, Brno
National Museum (Prague), Prague
Chlupáč's Museum of the History of Earth, Prague
Městské muzeum Čáslav, Čáslav

Denmark
Natural History Museum of Denmark, Copenhagen
Zoological Museum
Botanical Garden, Botanical Museum & Library
Geological Museum
Fur Museum, Fur Island
The Freshwater Museum, part of Søhøjlandets Økomuseum, Ry
Naturhistorisk Museum, Aarhus
Museum Sønderjylland: Naturhistorie & Palæontologi, Gram
Naturama, Svendborg

Estonia

Estonian Museum of Natural History, Tallinn
University of Tartu Natural History Museum, Tartu

Finland
 Finnish Museum of Natural History, Helsinki
Geological Museum, University of Oulu, Oulu
Mineralogical Museum of the Geological Survey of Finland, Espoo
Tampere Mineral Museum, Tampere
Natural History Museum of Tampere

France
Dinosauria, Espéraza
Micropolis (La Cité des Insectes), Millau
Musée des Beaux-Arts et d'Histoire Naturelle Châteaudun, Châteaudun
Musée des Confluences, Lyon
 Musée d'Histoire Naturelle de Lille, Lille
Musée de Vendôme, Vendôme
Musée Géologique, Vernet-les-Bains
 Musée Requien, Avignon
 Musée zoologique de la ville de Strasbourg, Strasbourg
 Museum d'Histoire Naturelle Aix-en-Provence, Aix-en-Provence
 Muséum d'histoire naturelle d'Angers, Angers
 Muséum d'histoire naturelle de Marseille, Marseille
 Muséum d'Histoire Naturelle de Blois, Blois
 Muséum d'Histoire Naturelle de Bourges, Bourges
 Muséum d'histoire naturelle d'archéologie et d'ethnographie, Cherbourg-Octeville
 Muséum d'Histoire Naturelle de Grenoble, Grenoble
 Muséum d'Histoire Naturelle du Havre, Le Havre
 Natural History Museum of Nantes
 Muséum d'histoire naturelle de Nice
 Muséum d'Histoire Naturelle de Rouen, Rouen
 Muséum d'Histoire Naturelle de Toulouse, Toulouse
Muséum d'Histoire Naturelle de Tours, Tours
Muséum des Sciences Naturelles et de la Préhistoire de Chartres, Chartres
Muséum des Sciences Naturelles d'Orléans, Orléans
 Muséum national d'histoire naturelle, Paris

Georgia
"Animal World" – Nature Museum, Tbilisi
Georgian National Museum, Institute of Palaeobiology
Museum of Georgian Geophysical Sciences History, Tbilisi

Germany
Aquazoo-Löbbecke-Museum Düsseldorf
Biozentrum Grindel und Zoologisches Museum, Hamburg
Botanisches Museum, Berlin
Bürgermeister-Müller-Museum, Solnhofen
Deutsches Meeresmuseum, Stralsund
Geologisches Museum München, Munich
Haus der Natur, Cismar
Hessisches Landesmuseum Darmstadt
Jura Museum, Eichstätt
Lower Saxony State Museum (German: Niedersächsisches Landesmuseum Hannover), Hanover
Mineralogisches Museum, Philipps-University Marburg, Marburg
Museum der Natur Gotha, Thuringia
Müritzeum, Waren (Müritz)
Museum der Natur Gotha, Gotha
Museum für Natur und Umwelt, Lübeck
Museum für Naturkunde, Berlin
Museum für Naturkunde Chemnitz, Chemnitz
Museum für Naturkunde Magdeburg, Magdeburg
Museum Heineanum Halberstadt
Museum Koenig, Bonn
Museum of Man and Nature (German Museum Mensch und Natur), Munich
Museum of Natural History in the Ottoneum, Official site in German, Kassel
Museum Wiesbaden, Natural History Collections – MWNH, Wiesbaden
Museum Witt, Munich
Senckenberg Museum, Frankfurt
Staatliches Naturhistorisches Museum, Braunschweig
Naturhistorisches Museum, Mainz
Naturkundemuseum Coburg, Coburg
Naturkunde Museum, Bamberg
Naturkundemuseum Erfurt, Thuringia
Naturkundemuseum Leipzig, Leipzig
Neanderthal Museum, Mettmann
Paläontologisches Museum München, Munich
Palatine Museum of Natural History (Pfalzmuseum für Naturkunde), Bad Dürkheim
Phyletisches Museum, Jena
Senckenberg Deutsches Entomologisches Institut, Müncheberg
Senckenberg Museum für Naturkunde, Görlitz
State Museum of Natural History Karlsruhe (German: Staatliches Museum für Naturkunde), Karlsruhe
State Museum of Natural History Stuttgart (German: Staatliches Museum für Naturkunde), Stuttgart
State Museum of Zoology (German:  Senckenberg Naturhistorische Sammlungen), Dresden
Südostbayerisches Naturkunde- und Mammut-Museum, Siegsdorf
Übersee-Museum Bremen, Bremen
Urwelt-Museum Hauff (Hauff Museum of the Prehistoric World), Holzmaden
Westfälisches Museum für Naturkunde, Münster
Zoological Museum of Kiel University, Kiel
Zoologische Staatssammlung München, Munich

Greece

Natural History Museum of Meteora and Mushroom Museum, Kalampaka, Trikala
Cretan Aquarium, Heraklion
Goulandris Natural History Museum, Athens
Volos Natural History Museum, Volos
Mineralogical Museum of Lavrion, Athens
Museum of Mineralogy and Petrology, University of Athens
Natural History Museum of Crete
Natural History Museum of the Lesvos Petrified Forest, Lesvos
Rhodes Aquarium, Rhodes
Zoological Museum of the University of Athens
Museum of Mineralogy & Paleontology Stamatiadis, Ialysos, Rhodes

Greenland
Greenland National Museum and Archives, Nuuk

Hungary
Danube Museum (Duna Múzeum), Esztergom
Deri Museum, Official site in Hungarian, Debrecen
Exhibition of Natural Science, Janus Pannonius Múzeum Természettudományi Osztálya, Pécs
Geological Museum of Hungary, Budapest
Hungarian Geographical Museum, Magyar Környezetvédelmi és Vízügyi Múzeum "Duna Múzeum", Esztergom
 Hungarian Natural History Museum, Budapest
Jazygian Museum (Jász Múzeum), Jászberény
Kazinczy Ferenc Múzeum, Sátoraljaújhely
Komlo Natural Science Collection (Komlói Természettudományi Gyűjtemény), Komló
Mátra Múzeum, Gyöngyös
Mihály Munkácsy Museum, Békéscsaba
Móra Ferenc Múzeum, Szeged
Museum of Natural Sciences of Bakony (Bakonyi Természettudományi Múzeum), Zirc
Ottó Herman Museum, Miskolc

Iceland
Natural History Museum of Kópavogur, Kópavogur

Ireland
Natural History Museum, Dublin
Trinity College Dublin Zoological Museum
James Mitchell Geological Museum, National University of Ireland, Galway

Italy

 Museo Civico Scienze Naturali Enrico Caffi, Bergamo
University Museums, University of Bologna, Bologna
Museo della Preistoria Luigi Donini, San Lazzaro di Savena, Bologna
Museo del Fossile del Monte Baldo, Brentonico, Trentino-Alto Adige/Südtirol
 Museo Civico di Storia Naturale, Carmagnola (Piedmont)
 Museo Civico Comunale di Comiso, (Sicily)
 Museo Civico di Storia Naturale di Ferrara, Ferrara
Museo di Storia Naturale di Firenze, University of Florence, Florence
 Museo Civico di Storia Naturale Giacomo Doria, Genoa
 Museo di Storia Naturale della Maremma, Grosseto
 Museo di Storia Naturale del Mediterraneo, Livorno
 Museo di Scienze Naturali, Lodi, Lombardy
 Museo Civico di Storia Naturale di Milano, Milan
 Zoological Museum of Naples, Naples
 Museo di Geologia e Paleontologia, University of Padua, Padua
 Museo per la Storia dell'Università, University of Pavia, Pavia
 Museo di Storia Naturale, University of Pavia, Pavia
 Museo di Archeologia, University of Pavia, Pavia
 Museo di Mineralogia, University of Pavia, Pavia
Natural History Museum, Pisa
Museo Geologico delle Dolomiti, Predazzo, Trentino-Alto Adige/Südtirol
Museo Civico di Zoologia di Roma, Rome
Geological Museum, Rome
 Museo Civico Rovereto, Rovereto
 Museo Regionale di Scienze Naturali, Saint-Pierre
 Museo di Storia Naturale, Sulmona
 Museo di Storia Naturale Bios Taras, Taranto
 Museo Tridentino di Scienze Naturali, Trento
 Civico Museo di Storia Naturale di Trieste, Trieste
 Turin Museum of Natural History, Turin
 Museo di Storia Naturale di Venezia, Venice
 Museo Civico di Storia Naturale, Verona

Latvia
Latvian National Museum of Natural History

Liechtenstein
Liechtenstein National Museum, Vaduz

Lithuania
Palanga Amber Museum, Palanga
Tadas Ivanauskas Zoological Museum, Kaunas

Luxembourg
National Museum of Natural History Luxembourg, Luxembourg City

Macedonia
Macedonian Museum of Natural History, Skopje

Malta
National Museum of Natural History, Mdina

Moldova
National Museum of Ethnography and Natural History, Chișinău

Monaco
Oceanographic Museum, Monaco-Ville

Montenegro
Natural History Museum of Montenegro, Podgorica

The Netherlands
 Naturalis (or National Museum of Natural History), Leiden
Natuurhistorisch Museum Maastricht, Maastricht
Natuurhistorisch Museum Rotterdam, Rotterdam
Oertijdmuseum, Boxtel
Teylers Museum, Haarlem
Zoologisch Museum Amsterdam, Amsterdam
Universiteitsmuseum Utrecht, Utrecht
Universiteitsmuseum Groningen, Groningen
Museon, The Hague
Natuurhistorisch Museum Natura Docet, Denekamp
Natuurhistorisch en Volkenkundig Museum Oudenbosch, Oudenbosch
Gelders Geologisch Museum, Velp
Natuurmuseum Nijmegen, Nijmegen
Schelpenmuseum paal 14, Schiermonnikoog
Ecomare, Texel
Natuurmuseum Fyslan, Leeuwarden

Norway
Agder Natural History Museum and Botanical Garden, Kristiansand
Bergen Museum, Bergen
Naturhistorisk museum, Universitetet i Oslo (Natural History Museum at the University of Oslo), Oslo
Tromsø University Museum, Tromsø

Poland
 Museum of Evolution Warsaw, Warsaw
 Museum of Natural History Wroclaw University, Wroclaw
Natural History Museum of the Białowieża National Park, Białowieża Forest
Upper Silesian Museum (Muzeum Górnośląskie w Bytomiu), Bytom
 Museum of the Earth Warsaw, Warsaw

Portugal
Museu Oceanográfico "Prof. Luiz Saldanha" do Portinho da Arrábida, Azeitão
Museu Botânico da Escola Superior Agrária de Beja, Beja
Science Museum of the University of Coimbra, Coimbra
Museu de História Natural do Funchal, Funchal, Madeira Island
National Museum of Natural History and Science, Lisbon, Lisbon
Museu Geológico – Laboratório Nacional de Energia e Geologia, Lisbon
Museu Maynense – Lisbon Academy of Sciences, Lisbon
Museu da Lourinhã, Lourinhã
Museu Aquário Vasco da Gama, Oeiras
Museu Carlos Machado, Ponta Delgada
Museu de História Natural e da Ciência da Universidade do Porto, Porto
Sintra Natural History Museum, Sintra
Museu de Geologia "Fernando Real" da Universidade de Trás-os-Montes e Alto Douro, Vila Real

Romania
Bucegi Natural Park Museum, Sinaia
Colţi Museum of Amber
Constantin Gruescu Iron Aesthetic Mineralogy Museum, Ocna de Fier
County Museum of Satu Mare (Szatmárnémeti Múzeum), Satu Mare
Danube Delta Natural Sciences Museum, Tulcea
Haaz Rezső Múzeum, Odorheiu Secuiesc
Ion Borcea Museum Complex of Natural Sciences, Bacău
Mihai Băcescu Waters Museum, Fălticeni
Mineralogical Museum and Zoological Museum of the Babeş-Bolyai University, Cluj-Napoca
Museum of Banat, Natural Sciences Department, Timișoara
Museum of Brăila, Department of Natural Sciences, also, Brăila
Museum of Gold, Brad
Museum of Natural Science (Muzeul de Ştiinţe Naturale), Aiud
Museum of Oltenia, Craiova
Muzeul Banatului (Banat Museum), Timișoara
Muzeul de Istorie Naturală – Iaşi, Iaşi
Muzeul de Ştiinţe ale Naturii Piatra Neamţ; see also Iaşi, Romania Museums, Iaşi
Muzeul de Ştiinţele Naturii Roman, Roman
Muzeul Naţional de Istorie Naturală Grigore Antipa (Grigore Antipa Natural History Museum), Bucharest
Muzeul Ţării Crişurilor, Oradea
Muzeul Tarisznyás Márton, English description, Gheorgheni
National Geology Museum, Bucharest
Natural History Museum Sibiu, Sibiu
Natural Sciences and Hunting Museum, Vatra Dornei
Natural Sciences Museum Dorohoi
Natural Sciences Museum Complex, Constanţa
Natural Sciences Museum Complex Galaţi, Galaţi
Paleontological and Stratighraphical Museum of the Babeş-Bolyai University, Cluj-Napoca
Prahova County Natural Sciences Museum, Ploieşti
Sediul Muzeului de Ştiinţele Naturii (Mureș County Museum, Natural History Department), Târgu Mureş
Székely National Museum (Székely Nemzeti Múzeum), Sfântu Gheorghe
Szekler Museum of Ciuc (Csíky Székely Múzeum), Miercurea-Ciuc
Vrancea Museum, Natural Sciences Department, Focşani

Russia
Earth History Museum, Vernadsky State Geological Museum, Moscow
Fersman Mineralogical Museum, Moscow
Zoological Museum of Moscow University
Geological Museum, Siberian Branch of the Russian Academy of Sciences, Novosibirsk
Siberian Zoological Museum website English
Kotelnich Palaeontological Museum, Kirov Oblast
Kunstkamera, Saint Petersburg
Orlov Museum, also Paleontological Institute of Russian Academy of Sciences, Moscow
State Darwin Museum, Moscow
Zoological Museum of the Russian Academy of Science, Saint Petersburg
St. Petersburg University Museum of the Department of Invertebrate Zoology
Paleontological Museum of Saint Petersburg State University, Saint Petersburg
Mineralogical Museum of Saint Petersburg State University, Saint Petersburg
Petrographical Museum of Saint Petersburg State University, Saint Petersburg

Serbia
 Museum of Natural History (Prirodnjački muzej), Belgrade
 Museum of Vojvodina, Novi Sad
 Museum of Natural History, Novi Sad

Slovenia
Natural History Museum of Slovenia (Prirodoslovni muzej Slovenije), Ljubljana

Slovakia
East Slovakia Museum, Košice
Slovak National Museum, Bratislava

Spain
Cau del Cargol Conquilles del Món (Shells of the World Museum, malacology), Catalonia
Institut Paleontològic Dr. M. Crusafont, Sabadell
Museo de Ciencias de Arnedo (Museum of Science Arnedo), Arnedo
Museo de Ciencias Naturales, Álava
Museu de Ciències Naturals, Barcelona
Museo de Ciencias Naturales (Guadalcazar) and Mocha Tower, Córdoba
Museo Geominero, Madrid
Museo Municipal de Ciencias Naturales (Municipal Museum of Natural Science), Valencia
Museo Nacional de Ciencias Naturales, Madrid
Museo Paleontologico de la Universidad de Zaragoza, Zaragoza
Museu de Ciencies Naturals de Costix, Majorca
Museu de Granollers Ciències Naturals, Granollers
Museu de les Papallones de Catalunya, Lleida
Museu Geològic del Seminari de Barcelona, Barcelona
Museu Montsia, Amposta
Museu Valencià d'Història Natural – Fundación Entomológica Torres Sala, Valencia
Museum of Zoology, University of Navarra, Pamplona

Sweden
Biologiska Museet (Biological Museum), Djurgården, Stockholm
Gotland Museum (Gotlands museum), Visby
Geological Museum Villa Heidelberg, Klimpfjäll
Göteborg Natural History Museum (Göteborgs Naturhistoriska Museum), Gothenburg
Malmö Museums – Natural History Museum, Malmö
Swedish Museum of Natural History (Naturhistoriska riksmuseet) Stockholm
Swedish Amber Museum, Höllviken
Universeum, Gothenburg
Lund University Zoology Museum (Lunds Universitet Zoologiska museet), Lund
Museum of Evolution, Uppsala University (Evolutions Museet Uppsala Universitet), Uppsala

Switzerland
 Cantonal Museum of Geology (Musée cantonal de géologie), Lausanne
 Cantonal Museum of Zoology (Musée cantonal de zoologie),  Lausanne
 Musée d'histoire naturelle, Fribourg
 Natural History Museum of Geneva
 Naturhistorisches Museum Basel (Natural History Museum Basel)
 Naturhistorisches Museum der Burgergemeinde Bern (Natural History Museum of Bern), Bern
 Natur-Museum Luzern, Lucerne
 Paläontologisches Museum, Zürich
 Zoological Museum of the University of Zurich, Zürich
 Anthropological Museum of the University of Zurich, Zürich
 Aathal Dinosaur Museum, Aathal

Turkey
Istanbul Zoology Museum

Ukraine
National Museum of Natural History at the National Academy of Sciences of Ukraine, Kyiv
State Museum of Natural History, former Didushytskyi museum, Lviv
Zoological Museum of Kyiv University, Kyiv
Zoological Museum of Kharkiv University, Kharkiv
Zoological Museum of Lviv University, Lviv
Zoological Museum of Luhansk University, Luhansk
Zoological Museum of Taurida University, Simferopol
Scientific Museum of Nikitsky Botanical Garden, Yalta
Odessa Archeological Museum

United Kingdom

England
Bagshaw Museum, Batley
Booth Museum of Natural History, Brighton
Bristol City Museum and Art Gallery, Bristol
Buxton Museum & Art Gallery, Buxton
Camborne School of Mines Mineral Museum, Tremough, Cornwall
Charnwood Museum, Loughborough, Leicestershire
Chelmsford Museum, Chelmsford
Cole Museum of Zoology, Reading
Dinosaur Isle, Isle of Wight
Dorman Museum, Linthorpe
Grant Museum of Zoology, London
Hancock Museum, Newcastle upon Tyne
Haslemere Educational Museum, Haslemere, Surrey
Horniman Museum, London
Ipswich Museum, Ipswich
Kendal Museum, Kendal
Lapworth Museum of Geology, University of Birmingham, Edgbaston
Manchester Museum, Manchester
Museum of Lancashire, Lancashire
 Natural History Museum, London
 Natural History Museum at Tring, Tring
 Norwich Castle, Norwich
 Oxford University Museum of Natural History, Oxford
 Potteries Museum & Art Gallery, Stoke-on-Trent
 Powell-Cotton Museum, Quex Park, Birchington, Kent
 Royal Cornwall Museum, Truro
 Sedgwick Museum of Earth Sciences, University of Cambridge, Cambridge
 Tolson Museum, Huddersfield
 Cambridge University Museum of Zoology, Cambridge
 University of Bristol Geology Museum, University of Bristol, Bristol
 Weston Park Museum, Sheffield
 Wollaton Hall Natural History Museum, Nottingham
 World Museum Liverpool, Liverpool
 Yorkshire Museum, York
 Yorkshire Natural History Museum, Sheffield

Scotland
Creetown Gem Rock Museum, Creetown, Galloway
Elgin Museum, Elgin, Moray
Hunterian Museum and Art Gallery, Glasgow
National Museums of Scotland, Royal Museum, Edinburgh
Kelvingrove Art Gallery and Museum, Glasgow
Bell Pettigrew Museum, University of St Andrews, St Andrews

Wales
National Museum Cardiff
Falconry Heritage Trust, Carmarthen

Northern Ireland
Ulster Museum, Belfast

North America

Bermuda
Bermuda Underwater Exploration Institute, Hamilton

Canada

Alberta
Glenbow Museum, Calgary
Royal Tyrrell Museum of Palaeontology, Drumheller
Royal Alberta Museum, Edmonton
University of Alberta Museums, Edmonton

British Columbia
Beaty Biodiversity Museum, University of British Columbia, Vancouver
Museum of Natural History, Vancouver Island University, Nanaimo
Pacific Museum of the Earth, University of British Columbia, Vancouver
Royal British Columbia Museum, Victoria

Manitoba
B.J. Hales Museum of Natural History, Brandon University, Brandon (closed)
Canadian Fossil Discovery Centre, Morden
Ed Leith Cretaceous Menagerie, University of Manitoba, Winnipeg
Irvin Goodon International Wildlife Museum, Boissevain
Robert B. Ferguson Museum of Mineralogy, University of Manitoba, Winnipeg
Manitoba Museum, Winnipeg
Whiteshell Natural History Museum, Whiteshell Provincial Park, Nutimik Lake

New Brunswick
Atlantic Salmon Museum, Doaktown
Cape Jourimain Nature Centre, Cape Jourimain
Grand Manan Museum, Grand Manan
Gaskin Museum of Marine Life, 
Miramichi History Museum, Miramichi
Miramichi Salmon Conservation Centre, 
New Brunswick Museum, Saint John
Sunbury Shores Arts & Nature Centre, Saint Andrews Parish

Newfoundland
Johnson Geo Centre, St. John's
The Rooms, St. John's

Nova Scotia
Fundy Geological Museum, Parrsboro
Nova Scotia Museum of Natural History, Halifax

Ontario
1000 Islands History Museum, Gananoque
Aquatarium, Brockville
Arkona Lions Museum, Arkona
Ball's Falls Centre for Conservation, Ball's Falls, Ontario
Bonnechere Museum, Bonnechere
Canadian Museum of Nature, Ottawa
Royal Ontario Museum, Toronto
The Earth Sciences Museum, University of Waterloo, Waterloo
The Miller Museum of Geology, Queen's University at Kingston
Museum of Northern History, Kirkland Lake
The Niagara Falls Museum, Niagara Falls
Pelee Island Heritage Centre, Pelee
Science North, Greater Sudbury
Stones 'N Bones Museum, Sarnia

Quebec
Lake Timiskaming Fossil Centre, Quebec City
Montreal Biosphere, Montreal
Montreal Insectarium, Montreal
Musée de la Nature et des Sciences, Sherbrooke
Musee du Fjord, La Baie
Musée de Paléontologie et de l'Evolution, Montreal
Musée Minéralogique d'Asbestos, Asbestos
Musée minèralogique et minier de Thetford Mines, Thetford Mines
Redpath Museum, Montreal

Saskatchewan
 Abernethy Nature-Heritage Museum, Abernethy
Ancient Echoes Interpretive Center, Herschel
Museum of Natural Sciences, University of Saskatchewan, Saskatoon
Royal Saskatchewan Museum, Regina
T.rex Discovery Centre, Eastend

Yukon
Kluane Museum of Natural History, Burwash Landing
Yukon Beringia Interpretive Centre, Whitehorse

Mexico
 Caracol, Museo de Ciencias de Ensenada, Ensenada
 Museo de Geología UNAM, Mexico City
 Museo de Historia Natural de la Ciudad de México, Mexico City
 Museo de las Aves de México, Coahuila
Museo de Paleontología de Delicias, Chihuahua
 Museo de Paleontología de Guadalajara, Guadalajara
Museo de Paleontología- UNAM, Mexico City
 Museo del Desierto, Coahuila
 Museo Nacional de Antropologia, Mexico City
 Tamux – Museo de Historia Natural de Tamaulipas, Tamaulipas
 Museo Paleontológico en Tocuila, Texcoco

United States

Oceania

Australia
Age of Fishes Museum, Canowindra, New South Wales
Australian Museum, Sydney
Australian Fossil and Mineral Museum, Bathurst, New South Wales
Biological Sciences Museum at Macquarie University, North Ryde, New South Wales
Broken Hill Geo Centre, Broken Hill, New South Wales
Butterfly Farm, Wilberforce, New South Wales
The Crystal Caves, North Queensland
Crystal Kingdom, Coonabarabran, New South Wales
Earth Sciences Museum, Macquarie University, North Ryde, New South Wales
Emmaville Mining Museum, Emmaville, New South Wales
Eumundi Museum, Eumundi, Queensland
Kronosaurus Korner, Richmond, Queensland
Macleay Museum – Sydney University, Sydney
Mining and Minerals Education Centre, Tasmanian Minerals Council, Hobart, Tasmania
Museums and Art Galleries of the Northern Territory, Darwin
Museum of Central Australia, Alice Springs, Northern Territory
Museum of Tropical Queensland, Townsville
Museum Victoria, Melbourne Museum, Melbourne
National Dinosaur Museum, Nicholls, Australian Capital Territory
Queensland Museum, Brisbane
Queen Victoria Museum and Art Gallery, Launceston, Tasmania
South Australian Museum, Adelaide
Tate Museum of Geology, Adelaide
Tasmanian Museum and Art Gallery, Hobart, Tasmania
Western Australian Museum, Perth
Western Australian Museum, Albany, Albany
Western Australian Museum Geraldton, Geraldton
Western Australian Museum, Kalgoorlie-Boulder, Kalgoorlie-Boulder

Indonesia
Museum Geologi Bandung, Bandung 
 Museum Geologi Bandung
Museum Zoologi Bandung Zoo, Bandung 
Bogor Zoological Museum Kebun Raya Bogor, Bogor
Museum Serangga dan Kupu-Kupu, Bogor
Museum Zoologi Ragunan Zoo, Jakarta
Museum Purbakala Sangiran, Sragen
Museum Patiayam, Pati
Museum Gunung Merapi, Yogyakarta
Museum Karst, Wonogiri
Museum Batu Mulia and Artefak Neolithikum, Purbalingga
Museum Gunung Api Batur, Bali 
Purbakala Archaeological Museum, Bali
Bali Shell Museum, Bali 
Museum Sumatera Utara, Medan 
Zoological Museum of Pematangsiantar, Pematangsiantar
Museum Batubara, Sawahlunto
Bukittinggi Zoological Museum, Bukittingi
Museum Sulawesi Tengah, Palu
Museum Mandar Majene, Majene

New Zealand
Auckland War Memorial Museum, Auckland
Canterbury Museum, Christchurch
Museum of New Zealand Te Papa Tongarewa, Wellington
Otago Museum, Dunedin
Southland museum and art gallery, Invercargill
Te Manawa: Museum, Gallery, Science Centre, Palmerston North

Papua New Guinea 

 National Agricultural Insect Collection, Port Moresby

South America

Argentina
Dr. Ángel Gallardo Provincial Natural Sciences Museum, Rosario
Instituto y Museo de Ciencias Naturales, San Juan
Museo Argentino de Ciencias Naturales "Bernardino Rivadavia", Buenos Aires
Museo Municipal de Ciencias Naturales "Lorenzo Scaglia" Mar del Plata
Museo Carmen Funes, Plaza Huincul
Museo de Ciencias Naturales Augusto G. Schulz" de Resistencia (Museum of Natural Sciences), Chaco Province
Museo de Ciencias Naturales Carlos Darwin (Carlos Darwin Museum of Natural Sciences), Buenos Aires
Museo de Ciencias Naturales de Coronel Pringles, Buenos Aires
Museo de Ciencias Naturales y Antropológicas "Juan Cornelio Moyano", Mendoza
Museo de Geología Mineralogía y Palentología, Jujuy
Museo de Geología y Paleontología, Neuquen
Museo de Historia Natural "Francisco Javier Muñiz" de Moreno, Moreno Partido
Museo de La Plata, Buenos Aires
Museo de Mineralogia y Geologia Dr. A. Stelzner
Museo de Paleontologia, Universidad Nacional de Córdoba, Córdoba
Museo del Lago Gutierrez "Dr. Rosendo Pascual", Río Negro Province
Museo del Mar, Mar del Plata
Museo Gallardo, San Lorenzo
Museo Histórico y de Ciencias Naturales "Pago de los Lobos", Lobos
Museo Mariposa del Mundo, Butterflies of the World Museum, San Miguel
Museo Municipal de Ciencias Naturales de Monte Hermoso, Monte Hermoso
Museo Municipal de Historia Natural de Gral. Alvear/Gen. Alvear Municipal Museum of Natural History, General Alvear
Museo Municipal "Punta Hermengo" de Miramar, Buenos Aires
Museo Paleontológico Egidio Feruglio
Museo Paleontológico y Petrolero Astra, Astra Museum of Paleontology and Oil, Chubut
Museo Provincial de Ciencias Naturales (Provincial Museum of Natural Sciences) "Florentino Ameghino", Santa Fe
Museo Provincial de Ciencias Naturales Puerto Madryn (Provincial Museum of Natural Sciences of Chubut)
Museo Provincial de Historia Natural de La Pampa, La Pampa Province
Museo Regional de Ciencias Naturales "Prof. Rodolfo Parodi Bustos", Salta Province
Museo Regional Municipal de El Calafate/El Calafate Municipal Regional Museum, Santa Cruz Province
Museum of Natural Sciences "Augusto G. Schulz", Chaco Province
Museum of Paleontology "Egidio Feruglio" (MEF)
Museum of Patagonia, Río Negro Province
Paleorama, Museo Itinerante, Buenos Aires
Museo Miguel Lillo de Ciencias Naturales, Tucuman Province

Bolivia
Museo de Anatomía de la Universidad de San Francisco Xavier
Museo de Historia Natural, La Paz
Museo de History Natural Noel Kempff Mercado, Santa Cruz
Museo de Historia Natural Alcide d'Orbigny, Cochabamba

Brazil
Museu de Arqueologia e Etnologia – USP, São Paulo, SP
Museu de Ciências Naturais – PUC MINAS, Belo Horizonte, MG
Museu Entomológico Fritz Plaumann, Santa Catarina
Museu Geológico Valdemar Lefèvre, São Paulo, SP
Museu de Geociências – USP, São Paulo, SP
Museu de História Natural de Taubaté, Taubaté
Museu de Historia Natural Capão da Imbuia Wood, Curitiba
Museu Nacional, UFRJ, Rio de Janeiro, RJ
Museu Paraense Emílio Goeldi, Belém
Museu de Rochas, Minerais e Minérios – USP, São Paulo, SP
Museum of Veterinary Anatomy FMVZ USP, São Paulo
Museu de Zoologia da Universidade Estadual de Campinas, Campinas, São Paulo state
Museu de Zoologia da Universidade de São Paulo, São Paulo

Chile
Chilean National Museum of Natural History, Santiago
Museo de Historia Natural de Valparaiso, Región de Valparaiso
Museo de Historia Natural de Concepción, Región del Biobío

Colombia
Museo de Historia Natural, Popayán
Museo La Salle, Bogotá
Museo Paleontológico, National University of Colombia
Museo Prehistórico
Universidad Nacional de Colombia: Museo de Historia Natural (Museum of Natural History), Museo Entomológico (Entomological museum), Bogotá
Botanic Garden Medellín

Ecuador
Gustavo Orcés V. Natural History Museum, Quito

Guyana
Guyana National Museum, Georgetown

Paraguay
Botanical Garden and Zoo of Asunción, Asunción

Peru
Museum of Natural History, Lima (Museo de Historia Natural), National University of San Marcos, Lima
Museo La Salle, Lima

Trinidad and Tobago
 The University of the West Indies Zoology Museum, Saint Augustine, Trinidad and Tobago

Uruguay
Museo del Mar, La Barra del Maldonado
National Museum of Natural History, Montevideo

Venezuela
Museo de Biología de la Universidad Central de Venezuela (MBUCV), Caracas
Museo de Ciencias Naturales, Caracas
Museo de Ciencias Naturales de Guanare
Museo de Historia Natural La Salle, Caracas
Museo de la Estación Biológica de Rancho Grande
Museo del Instituto de Zoología Agrícola 'Francisco Fernández, Aragua
Museo Marino, Boca de Río
Museo Oceanologico Hermano Benigno Roman de la Fundación La Salle, Punta de Piedras, Isla Margarita
Museo Paleontológico de Urumaco, Urumaco
Museum Entomológico, Colección de Insectos de Interés Agrícola y su combate Insect Collection Interest Agricultural

See also

 Lists of museums

References

External links
 Biological Collections Index
 Natural History Museum and Collections
 EU-funded project for Museums of Natural History

National History

Nature-related lists